Superbird-A1, also identified as Superbird-1A before launch, was a geostationary communications satellite designed and manufactured by Ford Aerospace (now Space Systems/Loral) on the SSL 1300 satellite bus. It was originally ordered by Space Communications Corporation (SCC), which later merged into the SKY Perfect JSAT Group. It had a mixed Ku-band and Ka-band payload and operated on the 158° East longitude.

It was ordered in 1985 along Superbird-B, Superbird-A1 and Superbird-B1 on the very first order of the SSL 1300 platform.

Satellite description 
The spacecraft was the fourth satellite designed and manufactured by Ford Aerospace on the SSL 1300 satellite bus. It was based on the design of the Intelsat V series and offered a three-axis stabilized platform.

With its solar panels fully extended it spanned . Its power system generated approximately 4 kW of power due to two wings with three solar panels each. It also a NiH2 battery to survive the solar eclipses. It would serve as the main satellite on the 158°E longitude position of the Superbird.

It included enough propellant for orbit circularization and 10 years of operation.

Its payload is composed of 14 Ku-band plus 30 Ka-band transponders.

History 
Space Communications Corporation (SCC) was founded in 1985, the same year as the original companies that later formed JSAT. On 1986 SCC ordered four spacecraft, Superbird-1, Superbird-2, Superbird-A1 and Superbird-B1 from Ford Aerospace, which became Space Systems/Loral in October 1990.

On 1 December 1992 at 22:48:00 UTC Superbird-A1, was launched aboard an Ariane 42P. It was injected into a 192 km × 35,990 km × 7° geosynchronous transfer orbit (GTO), from which it climbed through three liquid apogee engine (LEA) firings. It was positioned in its 158° East longitude position where it was integrated to the Superbird communication network.

References 

Communications satellites in geostationary orbit
Satellites using the SSL 1300 bus
Spacecraft launched in 1992
Communications satellites of Japan
1992 in Japan